Greek National Road 57 (abbr: EO57) is a national highway of Greece. It connects Drama with the Bulgarian border near Exochi, via Prosotsani and Kato Nevrokopi. At the border it is connected with the Bulgarian national road 19 to Gotse Delchev.

References

57
Roads in Eastern Macedonia and Thrace